Sowmaeh-ye Sofla (also Romanized as Şowma‘eh-ye Soflá) is a village in Sarajuy-ye Sharqi Rural District, Saraju District, Maragheh County, East Azerbaijan Province, Iran. At the 2006 census, its population was 1,713, in 296 families.

References 

Towns and villages in Maragheh County